Myanmar, then competing as Burma, first participated at the Olympic Games in 1948, and has sent athletes to compete in every Summer Olympic Games since then, except for the 1976 Games.  The nation has never participated in the Winter Olympic Games.  Since the 1992 Games, the nation has been designated as Myanmar in Olympic competition.

As of 2021, no Burmese athlete has ever won an Olympic medal. Kay Thi Win placed fourth in Weightlifting at the 2000 Summer Olympics – Women's 48 kg.

The National Olympic Committee for Myanmar was created in 1947 and recognized by the International Olympic Committee that same year.

Medal tables

Medals by Summer Games

See also
 List of flag bearers for Myanmar at the Olympics
 :Category:Olympic competitors for Myanmar
 Myanmar at the Paralympics
 Myanmar at the Asian Games
 Myanmar at the Asian Para Games
 Myanmar at the Southeast Asian Games

References

External links
 
 
 

 
Olympics